The FLAGS (Far North Liquids and Associated Gas System) pipeline is a natural gas pipeline in the UK sector of the North Sea which, together with its associated pipelines, is used to transport gas and associated liquids from oil and gas fields in the northern North Sea to the St. Fergus gas terminal.

Pipelines 
The FLAGS system gas pipelines are:

Installations 
FLAGS provides the gas export route for the following installations.

 Cormorant A
 North Cormorant
North West Hutton
Ninian Central
 Ninian North & South
 Brent 'A', 'B', 'C' and 'D'
 Tern
 Magnus
Thistle
 Murchison
 Statfjord
 Heather
 Gjøa
 Gas exported from West of Shetland oil fields (Foinaven, Schiehallion/Loyal and Clair)
 Knarr

Infrastructure 
It starts at Brent 'A' and terminates at St. Fergus near Peterhead in Scotland. Pipe laying was completed in April 1978 and finally commissioned in May 1982. The pipeline was laid by SEMAC 1.

At Brent A, the pipeline is connected with the Northern Leg and Western Leg transmission systems, carrying gas from a number of nearby fields.  

The 20-inch Northern Leg Gas Pipeline (NLGP) runs for 80 km from Magnus to Brent A with spurs to Thistle A, Murchison and Statfjord B. It originally served as the gas export route for these installations and delivered gas to Brent A for onward transmission to St Fergus via FLAGS. As some of these installation have become gas deficient it has served as their gas supply route. The pipeline has depressurisation facilities at Magnus. Gas from the NLGP is heated before flowing via manual pressure let-down valves to the HP and LP flare systems. Pre-heating the gas ensures that it remains within the temperature limits of the flare pipework after Joule-Thomson cooling across the let-down valves.

The 16-inch Western Leg Gas Pipeline (WLGP) transports  gas from Cormorant A to Brent A. It also takes gas from Ninian Central and North Cormorant. 

Natural gas from the Norwegian Statfjord field is fed through the Tampen pipeline, linking Norwegian and UK gas trunkline networks.

Inlet specification 
The inlet specification for gas transported in the FLAGS system is as follows:

Capacity and throughput 
The FLAGS system has a capacity of 33 million standard m3/ day.

Up to the end of 1991 the total cumulative throughput of FLAGS was 49,757 million cubic metres of gas. The throughput over the period 1992 to 2014 (in million cubic metres) was:

References

1982 establishments in Scotland
Economy of Scotland
Energy infrastructure completed in 1982
Natural gas pipelines in the United Kingdom
North Sea energy
Pipelines under the North Sea